Didier Kadio  (born 5 April 1990 in Man) is an Ivorian footballer who plays as a defender or defensive midfielder for Zhetysu in the Kazakhstan Premier League.

Career

Club
At the beginning of April 2014, Kadio moved to Kazakhstan, signing a loan deal with FC Zhetysu until the end of the 2014 season. Kadio returned to FC Shirak in December 2014, before signing for FF Jaro in Finland during February 2015.

On 22 January 2016, Kadio resigned for FC Zhetysu.

On 30 August 2016, Kadio joined Kerala Blasters in the Indian Super League. He scored his first goal for Kerala Blasters by levelling against Chennaiyin in Kochi on 12 November 2016. Kerala Blasters eventually won that match with score 3-1.

On 10 August 2018, SJK announced the signing of Kadio after his Pyunik contract expired on 8 August 2018. On 2 December 2019, SJK announced that Kadio had left the club after the expiration of his contract.

Kadio joined Al-Hilal Club on January 8, 2020.

On 9 February 2021 Kadio signed for FC Alashkert. On 24 December 2022, Alashkert announced the departure of Kadio.

On 24 January 2023, Zhetysu announced the return of Kadio.

Career statistics

Honours
FC Shirak
 Armenian Premier League (1): 2012–13
 Armenian Independence Cup (1): 2011–12
Kerala Blasters FC
 Indian Super League : Runner-up (1): 2016

References

External links 
 

1990 births
Living people
People from Man, Ivory Coast
Ivorian footballers
Ivorian expatriate footballers
Kazakhstan Premier League players
Armenian Premier League players
Veikkausliiga players
FC Shirak players
FC Zhetysu players
FF Jaro players
Expatriate footballers in Armenia
Expatriate footballers in Kazakhstan
Expatriate footballers in Finland
Expatriate footballers in India
Association football defenders
Association football midfielders
Ivorian expatriate sportspeople in Armenia
Ivorian expatriate sportspeople in Kazakhstan
Ivorian expatriate sportspeople in Finland
Ivorian expatriate sportspeople in India